Pasilobus is a genus of orb-weaver spiders first described by Eugène Simon in 1895.

Species
 it contains thirteen species from Asia and Africa:
Pasilobus antongilensis Emerit, 2000 – Madagascar
Pasilobus bufoninus (Simon, 1867) (type) – Taiwan, Indonesia (Java, Moluccas)
Pasilobus capuroni Emerit, 2000 – Madagascar
Pasilobus conohumeralis (Hasselt, 1894) – Indonesia (Sumatra, Java)
Pasilobus dippenaarae Roff & Haddad, 2015 – South Africa
Pasilobus hupingensis Yin, Bao & Kim, 2001 – China, Japan
Pasilobus insignis O. Pickard-Cambridge, 1908 – West Africa
Pasilobus kotigeharus Tikader, 1963 – India
Pasilobus laevis Lessert, 1930 – Congo
Pasilobus lunatus Simon, 1897 – Indonesia (Java, Sulawesi)
Pasilobus mammatus Pocock, 1898 – Solomon Is.
Pasilobus mammosus (Pocock, 1900) – West Africa
Pasilobus nigrohumeralis (Hasselt, 1882) – Indonesia (Sumatra)

Prey capture
Females of the genus Pasilobus construct "triangular spanning-thread webs". The webs have only two sectors, making them appear triangular. Widely spaced threads with sticky drops span the three radii of these webs. One end is attached in such a way that it readily breaks free. When a prey item is caught on one of these threads, the line parts at this end and the prey hangs from the web until it is hauled up by the spider.

The prey caught are almost entirely moths. Normal araneid orb webs are not effective at capturing moths, since their loose scales detach, allowing the moth to escape. Like other genera in the subfamily Cyrtarachninae s.l., Pasilobus species produce special sticky drops that adhere to moths. Some members of the subfamily have been shown to produce mimics of the sex pheromones that female moths emit to attract males, and it has been speculated that Pasilobus may do this as well.

References

Araneidae
Araneomorphae genera
Spiders of Africa
Spiders of Asia
Taxa named by Eugène Simon